Teruyuki Horie (born 15 January 1933) is a Japanese sailor. He competed in the Dragon event at the 1964 Summer Olympics.

References

External links
 

1933 births
Living people
Japanese male sailors (sport)
Olympic sailors of Japan
Sailors at the 1964 Summer Olympics – Dragon
Place of birth missing (living people)